Cult Records is an independent record label founded by Julian Casablancas (of The Strokes) in 2009. Initially used as an imprint for Casablancas' solo releases, Cult later became a standalone label, and in June 2014 entered a label services agreement with Kobalt as well as a digital distribution agreement with ONErpm.

Artists signed to Cult

Current 

 Cerebral Ballzy
 Exhibition
 The Growlers
 Har Mar Superstar
 Karen O
 Rey Pila
 Promiseland
 The Strokes
 The Voidz

Catalog Cult artists 

 Albert Hammond, Jr.
 C O L O R
 Everything Everything
 Exclamation Pony (Jen Turner of Here We Go Magic and Ryan Jarman of The Cribs)
 INHEAVEN
 Julian Casablancas
 Jehnny Beth & Julian Casablancas
 Reputante
 Songhoy Blues
 Surfbort
 The Virgins

References

External links
 Cult Records' Official site

Indie rock record labels
Alternative rock record labels
American independent record labels
Record labels established in 2009